José Leonardo Nunes Alves Sousa Jardim (born 1 August 1974) is a Portuguese football manager, currently in charge of Emirati club Shabab Al Ahli.

He started working at the professional level at the age of 35, initially with Camacha and Chaves, before winning promotion to the Primeira Liga with Beira-Mar in 2009–10. He later managed Braga, Olympiacos and Sporting CP. 

Jardim joined Monaco in 2014, and led the club to its eighth Ligue 1 championship in 2016–17. After being dismissed in October 2018, he was replaced by Thierry Henry and reappointed in January 2019, before being sacked once again in December.

Club career

Early years
Born in Barcelona, Venezuela to Portuguese parents who had settled in the country, Jardim returned to Portugal at a very young age, relocating to the island of Madeira. In 2001, aged only 27, he began working as assistant at local club A.D. Camacha, and remained three years in that role.

Subsequently, Jardim was promoted to head coach at the third division side, before moving to G.D. Chaves in the same division midway through the 2007–08 campaign. He led the northerners to promotion to the Segunda Liga in 2008-09, his only full season.

On 2 June 2009, Jardim was hired by S.C. Beira-Mar, and achieved another promotion in 2009–10, this time to the Primeira Liga. He stepped down midway through the 2010–11 season, even though the Aveiro team was performing above most expectations.

Braga
In May 2011, Jardim replaced Sporting CP-bound Domingos Paciência at the helm of S.C. Braga. He led the Minho club to third place in his only season – posting a record of 15 consecutive league wins in the process– but left after a disagreement with the president.

Olympiacos
On 5 June 2012, Jardim agreed to join Olympiacos F.C. of Super League Greece on a two-year contract, replacing Ernesto Valverde. He was controversially relieved of his duties on 19 January 2013, even though the team led the league by ten points.

Sporting CP
Jardim agreed to return to the country of his parents on 20 May 2013, signing a two-year deal with Sporting. Leading a team full of young players developed in the club's youth academy, he coached the Lisbon team to second place in 2013–14, with 25 points and 18 goals more than the previous season.

Monaco
On 10 June 2014, Jardim joined AS Monaco FC, signing a contract for two years with the option for another. He led the team to third place in Ligue 1 in his first year, and repeated the feat in 2015–16; in between, on 12 May 2015, he agreed to an extension until 2019.

In the 2016–17 campaign, displaying attacking football, particularly by several young players, Monaco won its first national championship in 17 years. The side also reached the semi-finals in both the UEFA Champions League and the Coupe de France, and lost the final of the Coupe de la Ligue to Paris Saint-Germain FC. In early June 2017, Jardim agreed a new deal until 2020.

On 11 October 2018, following a poor start to the season which included two losses in as many Champions League group stage matches, Jardim was sacked. On 25 January 2019, following the dismissal of Thierry Henry, he was reappointed.

Jardim was again relieved of his duties in late December 2019.

Al Hilal
On 2 June 2021, Jardim was appointed at Al Hilal SFC of the Saudi Professional League, on a one-year deal with an option for a second. On 14 February 2022, in spite of winning both the Saudi Super Cup and the AFC Champions League, he left by mutual consent.

Managerial statistics

Honours
Camacha
AF Madeira Cup: 2003–04

Beira-Mar
Segunda Liga: 2009–10

Olympiacos
Super League Greece: 2012–13
Greek Football Cup: 2012–13

Monaco
Ligue 1: 2016–17

Al Hilal
Saudi Super Cup: 2021
AFC Champions League: 2021

Individual
Ligue 1 Manager of the Year: 2016–17

References

External links

1974 births
Living people
Portuguese people of Venezuelan descent
Venezuelan emigrants to Portugal
Portuguese football managers
Primeira Liga managers
Liga Portugal 2 managers
G.D. Chaves managers
S.C. Beira-Mar managers
S.C. Braga managers
Sporting CP managers
Super League Greece managers
Olympiacos F.C. managers
Ligue 1 managers
AS Monaco FC managers
Saudi Professional League managers
Al Hilal SFC managers
UAE Pro League managers
Portuguese expatriate football managers
Expatriate football managers in Greece
Expatriate football managers in Monaco
Expatriate football managers in Saudi Arabia
Expatriate football managers in the United Arab Emirates
Portuguese expatriate sportspeople in Greece
Portuguese expatriate sportspeople in Monaco
Portuguese expatriate sportspeople in Saudi Arabia
Portuguese expatriate sportspeople in the United Arab Emirates
Golden Globes (Portugal) winners